The Battle of Lwów (sometimes called the Siege of Lwów) was a World War II battle for the control over the Polish city of Lwów (now Lviv, Ukraine) between the Polish Army and the invading Wehrmacht and the Red Army. The city was seen as the key to the so-called Romanian Bridgehead and was defended at all cost.

First clashes

Initially, the city was not to be defended, as it was considered to be too deep behind the Polish lines and too important to Polish culture for warfare. However, the speed of the Nazi invasion and the almost-complete disintegration of the Polish reserve Prusy Army after the Battle of Łódź resulted in the city being in danger of a German assault. On September 7, 1939, General Władysław Langner started to organise the defence of the city. Initially, the Polish forces were to defend the Bełżec – Rawa Ruska – Magierów line against the advancing German forces. General Rudolf Prich was given command of the Polish forces in the area, and on September 11, he prepared a plan to defend of the area. The Polish units were to defend the line of the San River, with nests of resistance along the Żółkiew – Rawa Ruska – Janów (also called Yaniv or Ivano-Frankove) to the west of the river Wereszycą – Gródek Jagielloński line.

The following day, the first German motorised units under Colonel Ferdinand Schörner, 1st Mountain Division (Wehrmacht), arrived in the area. After capturing Sambor (66 kilometres from Lwów), Schörner ordered his units to break through the weak Polish defences and to capture the city as soon as possible. The assault group was composed of two motorised infantry companies and a battery of 150 mm guns. The group outflanked the Polish defenders and reached the outskirts of the city but was bloodily repelled by the numerically-inferior Polish defenders. The Polish commander of the sector had only three infantry platoons and two 75 mm guns, but his forces were soon reinforced and held their positions until dawn. The same day, the command of the city's defence was passed to General Franciszek Sikorski, a veteran of World War I and the Polish–Soviet War.

The following day, the main forces of Schörner arrived, and at 14:00, the Germans broke into the city centre but again were driven back after heavy city fighting with the infantry units formed of local volunteers and refugees. To strengthen the Polish defences, General Kazimierz Sosnkowski left Lwów for Przemyśl on September 13 and assumed command over a group of Polish units that was trying to break through the German lines and to reinforce the city.

Schörner decided to fall back and to encircle the city while he awaited reinforcements. However, the Polish forces were now reinforced with units that had been withdrawn from central Poland and new volunteer units formed within the city. In addition, the Polish 10th Motorised Brigade, under Colonel Stanisław Maczek, arrived and started the heavy fighting to take back the suburb of Zboiska. The town was recaptured, but the surrounding hills remained in German hands and gave a good view of the city centre. Schörner placed his artillery there to shell the city. In addition, the city was almost constantly bombed by the Luftwaffe. Among the main targets for the German air force and artillery were prominent buildings, such as churches, hospitals, water plant and power plants.

New enemy

On September 17, 1939, the Soviet Union declared all pacts with Poland null and void as the Polish state had ceased to exist, and the Soviets joined Nazi Germany in the occupation of Poland. The forces of the 6th Red Army of the Ukrainian Front, under Filipp Golikov, crossed the border just east of Lwów and started a quick march towards the city. The Soviet invasion made all plans to defend the Romanian Bridgehead obsolete, and the Polish commander decided to withdraw all of his units to the close perimeter and to defend only the city itself, instead of the whole area, which strengthened the Polish defences. On September 18, the Luftwaffe dropped thousands of leaflets over the city to urge the Poles to surrender but was ignored. A general assault was started on the city, which was once again repulsed.

The intervention of the Red Army on 17 September also made necessary some changes in the Germans' plan of operations.

In the early morning of September 19, the first Soviet armoured units reached the eastern outskirts of the city and the suburb of Łyczaków. After a short fight, the Soviet units were pushed back. However, the Soviet forces completed the encirclement of the city overnight and linked with the German army besieging Lwów from the west.

The Polish defences were composed mainly of field fortifications and barricades constructed by the local residents under supervision of military engineers. Sikorski ordered organised defence of the outer city rim, with in-depth defences prepared. In the morning of September 19, the first Soviet envoys arrived and began negotiations with the Polish officers. Colonel Ivanov, the commander of a tank brigade, told Colonel Bronisław Rakowski that the Red Army entered Poland to help it fight the Germans and that the top priority for his units was to enter the city.

The same day, Schörner sent his envoy and demanded the city be surrendered to his troops. When the Polish envoy replied that he had no intention of signing such a document, he was informed that a general assault was ordered for September 21 and that the city would most surely be taken. Hitler's evacuation order from September 20 instructed Gerd von Rundstedt to leave the capture of Lwow to the Soviets. The attack planned by XVIII Corps for 21 September was cancelled, and the German corps prepared to move to the west of the Vistula-San River line. The following day, Sikorski decided that the situation of his forces was hopeless. The reserves, human resources and materiel were plentiful, but further defence of the city would be fruitless and result only in more civilian casualties. He decided to start surrender talks with the Red Army.

Surrender

On September 22, 1939, the act of surrender was signed in the suburb of Winniki in the morning. The Red Army accepted all of the conditions proposed by General Władysław Langner. The privates and NCOs were to leave the city, register themselves at the Soviet authorities and be allowed to go home. Officers would be allowed to keep their belongings and leave Poland for whichever country accepted them. The Soviet forces entered the city and the Soviet occupation began. The Soviets broke the terms of surrender shortly after noon when the NKVD began arresting all Polish officers. They were escorted to Tarnopol, where they were sent to various gulags in Russia, mostly to the infamous camp in Starobielsk. Most of them, including General Franciszek Sikorski himself, would be murdered in what became known as the Katyn Massacre in 1940.

Order of battle
The Polish defences lacked organisation and consisted only of token forces. Sikorski had approximately 11 infantry battalions, 5 batteries of artillery (mainly 75 mm guns), cavalry unit, engineering platoon and a small number of soldiers who had retreated into the city. On 18 September, two armoured trains (No.53 and No.55, with two 100 mm howitzers and four 75 mm guns in total) broke into the city from Kovel and took part in further actions.

The German units consisted of an entire 1st Mountain Division.

Polish

German

Soviet

Eyewitness account
From Lemberg to Bordeaux (Von Lemberg bis Bordeaux), written by Leo Leixner, a journalist and war correspondent, is a firsthand account of the battles that led to the fall of Poland, the Low Countries and France It includes an eyewitness description of the Battle of Lwów. In August 1939, Leixner had joined the Wehrmacht as a war reporter and was later promoted to sergeant, and in 1941, he published his recollections. The book was originally issued by Franz Eher Nachfolger, the central publishing house of the Nazi Party.

See also
 Lwów Eaglets
 Molotov–Ribbentrop Pact
List of World War II military equipment of Poland
List of German military equipment of World War II
List of Soviet Union military equipment of World War II

References 

Inline

General

 
 

Further reading

 
 
 

Battles of the Soviet invasion of Poland
History of Lviv
Sieges involving the Soviet Union
Sieges involving Germany
Sieges involving Poland
Lwów Voivodeship
September 1939 events